It's Not Killing Me is the debut solo album by American blues guitarist Mike Bloomfield. It was released in 1969 through Columbia Records. Following his success with the Paul Butterfield Blues Band, The Electric Flag, and in the Super Session recordings with Al Kooper, Bloomfield teamed up with former colleagues to record this largely self-written album.

The album peaked at No. 127 on the Billboard 200.

Reception

AllMusic criticized its "lack of a powerful vocalist" and the under-use of Bloomfield's guitar, going so far as to say "it makes about as much sense as Led Zeppelin having Jimmy Page sing lead while Robert Plant played tambourine!"

Track listing
All tracks have words and music credited to Mike Bloomfield, except as indicated.

Side one
"If You See My Baby" - 3:07
"For Anyone You Meet" – 4:07
"Good Old Guy" – 3:21
"Far Too Many Nights" – 5:07
"It's Not Killing Me" - 3:14

Side two
"Next Time You See Me" (Ben Tucker) – 2:57
"Michael's Lament" - 4:22
"Why Must My Baby" – 2:38
"The Ones I Loved Are Gone" – 3:07
"Don't Think About It Baby" – 3:33
"Goofers" – 1:50

Personnel
 Michael Bloomfield – lead guitar, vocals, piano, acoustic guitar
Bob Jones – drums, vocals
Ronny Schreff - drums, mallets, percussion
John Kahn – bass
Fred Olson – rhythm guitar, acoustic guitar
Ira Kamin – organ, piano, banjo
Mark Naftalin – organ, piano
Roy Ruby – organ
Michael Melford – guitar, mandolin, vocals
Nick Gravenites – vocals
Orville "Red" Rhodes – steel guitar
Ron Stallings – tenor saxophone
Mark Teel – baritone saxophone
Gerald Oshita – baritone and tenor saxophone
Noel Jewkes – soprano and tenor saxophone
John Wilmeth – trumpet
Marcus Doubleday – trumpet
Richard Santi – accordion
The Ace of Cups – vocals
Diane Tribuno - vocals
Technical
Daily Planet - cover design
Don Wilson - cover illustration
Peter Amft (son of Robert Amft) - cover photograph
Jim Marshall - rear cover photograph

References

1969 albums
Mike Bloomfield albums
Columbia Records albums
Albums produced by Nick Gravenites